Shane Zylstra (born November 16, 1996) is an American football tight end for the Detroit Lions of the National Football League (NFL). He played college football at Minnesota State.

College career
Zylstra was a member of the Minnesota State Mavericks for five seasons, redshirting his true freshman season. Zylstra finished his collegiate career with as Minnesota State school records of 227 catches, 4,297 receiving yards, and 54 touchdown receptions.

Professional career

Minnesota Vikings
Zylstra signed with the Minnesota Vikings as an undrafted free agent on May 7, 2021. After signing with the team he was moved from wide receiver to tight end. Zylstra was waived by the Vikings on August 31, 2021, during final roster cuts.

Detroit Lions
Zylstra was signed to the Detroit Lions' practice squad on September 1, 2021. He was elevated to the active roster on October 10, 2021, for the team's week 5 game against the Vikings. He signed a reserve/future contract with the Lions on January 10, 2022.

On October 1, 2022, Zylstra was waived by the Lions and re-signed to the practice squad. Zylstra was activated along with his brother Brandon Zylstra for Week 9 against the Green Bay Packers, Shane finished with his first professional touchdown, a one-yard touchdown reception from quarterback Jared Goff. He was signed to the active roster on November 13. On December 24, Zylstra caught three touchdown passes during a game against the Carolina Panthers.

Personal life

References

External links
Minnesota State Mavericks bio
Detroit Lions bio

1996 births
Living people
Players of American football from Minnesota
American football tight ends
Minnesota State Mavericks football players
Detroit Lions players
People from Kandiyohi County, Minnesota
Minnesota Vikings players
Minnesota State University, Mankato alumni